The 1940 United States presidential election in Kansas took place on November 5, 1940, as part of the 1940 United States presidential election. Voters chose nine representatives, or electors, to the Electoral College, who voted for president and vice president.

Kansas was won by Wendell Willkie (R–New York), running with Minority Leader Charles L. McNary, with 56.86% of the popular vote, against incumbent President Franklin D. Roosevelt (D–New York), running with Secretary Henry A. Wallace, with 42.40% of the popular vote. This was the first time since 1896 that Kansas voted for a losing candidate.

With 56.86% of the popular vote, Kansas would prove to be Willkie's third strongest state in the 1940 election in terms of popular vote percentage after South Dakota and neighboring Nebraska.

Results

Results by county

See also
 United States presidential elections in Kansas

References

Kansas
1940
1940 Kansas elections